Cowboy Cavalier is a 1948 American Western film directed by Derwin Abrahams and written by Ronald Davidson and J. Benton Cheney. The film stars Jimmy Wakely, Dub Taylor, Jan Bryant, Douglas Evans, Claire Whitney and William Ruhl. The film was released on July 11, 1948, by Monogram Pictures.

Plot
In the Old West, Mary Croft operates a stage line with the help of her foreman, Jimmy Wakely and his pal, Cannonball. Mary's daughter, Pat, returns to town with newcomer, Lance Regan, to whom she is attracted. Lance tells Mary he was recently a prison guard where he met her friend, Pat Collins, an inmate, who referred him to her for a job. Mary hires Regan as a guard. It is revealed that Regan's actual purpose is to use his job as insider to coordinate stage robberies with his gang. Regan purposefully deserts an ambush forcing Jimmy and Cannonball to chase off the robbers by themselves. Jimmy tells Mary to fire Regan for his desertion, but Regan convinces her otherwise.

Jimmy suspects Mary's refusal to fire Regan suggests he is blackmailing her, and he visits Collins on a prison work crew. Collins reveals that he and Mary were once married and that Pat is their daughter. Collins disclosed that to Regan, who was a fellow prisoner, and now Reagan is using the story to blackmail Mary who does not want others to know of her relationship to Collins.

Regan kills Pete Morris and steals his gold mine claim papers after he overhears Pete tell Mary of his good fortune. Regan's next move is to steal a gold bullion shipment deposited in the Croft's safe. Collins breaks out of prison and tries to stop Regan, but is subdued and forced by Regan and his gang to open the office safe containing the bullion. Jimmy intervenes, chasing the henchman from the Croft's office. With evidence mounting against him, Regan flees on a buckboard pursued by Jimmy. A gunfight ensues and the chase ends when Jimmy shoots Regan dead.

Pat leaves town on the next stage, and Jimmy rides off singing.

Cast
Jimmy Wakely as Jimmy Wakely
Dub Taylor as Cannonball 
Jan Bryant as Pat Croft 
Douglas Evans as Lance Regan
Claire Whitney as Mary Croft 
William Ruhl as Mason 
Steve Clark as Patrick Collins
Milburn Morante as Pete Morris
Bud Osborne as Joe 
Bob Woodward as Graves
Carol Henry as Prison Guard

References

External links
 

1948 films
1940s English-language films
American Western (genre) films
1948 Western (genre) films
Monogram Pictures films
Films directed by Derwin Abrahams
American black-and-white films
1940s American films